Hanashi is a village in Dharwad district of Karnataka, India.

Demographics 
As of the 2011 Census of India there were 348 households in Hanashi and a total population of 2,127 consisting of 1,100 males and 1,027 females. There were 311 children ages 0-6.

References

Villages in Dharwad district